We the People is a 2021 American animated streaming television series. Created by Chris Nee and executive produced by Kenya Barris, Barack Obama and Michelle Obama, the series premiered on July 4, 2021 on Netflix.

Episodes

Production 

We the People was conceived by Chris Nee at a dinner party in Los Angeles, California in November 2018. Nee cites Schoolhouse Rock! as one of the most significant inspirations for the series. H.E.R. described working alongside the Obamas on the series as a "life-changing" experience.

Release 
We the People was released on Netflix on July 4, 2021.

Reception 
The series received a mixed reception. Caroline Framke of Variety described the series as "well-meaning", but "not especially illuminating in the way it would like to be". Ashley Moulton of Common Sense Media called the series "Modern Schoolhouse Rock" and argued it "makes great bops from U.S. civics." She also said that the videos are "generally non-partisan, but [that] some of the content leans slightly left" and called it a "superlative effort from a diverse group of talented creators."

The series was nominated for a GLAAD Award in Outstanding Children's Programming.

Accolades

References

External links
 
 
 

2021 American television series debuts
2021 American television series endings
2020s American animated television series
2020s American black cartoons
2020s American musical comedy television series
2020s American political comedy television series
2020s American satirical television series
American children's animated comedy television series
American children's animated musical television series
Animated music videos
Children's and Family Emmy Award winners
English-language Netflix original programming
Political satirical television series
Television series by Higher Ground Productions
Television series by Netflix Animation
Michelle Obama